The 2005 ICC Trophy was a cricket tournament held in Ireland between 1 July and 13 July 2005. It was an international one-day tournament played over 50 overs per side between 12 Associate Members of the International Cricket Council. It served as the final part of the Cricket World Cup qualification process, coming with the prize of a place in the 2007 Cricket World Cup (and together with it a share of US$2.5 million for future development) for the five top-ranked teams, and with the prize of official One-Day International status from 1 January 2006 (until the 2009 ICC Trophy) for the five top-ranked teams along with Kenya (who had already been given official one-day status until the 2009 ICC Trophy and a spot in the 2007 World Cup).

For the first time five spots were on offer for the World Cup, previously three. On 7 July, the top 4 teams Scotland, Canada and for the first time Ireland and Bermuda qualified for the 2007 Cricket World Cup and, from 1 January 2006, gained official One-Day International status. On 11 July the Netherlands also achieved this by beating the United Arab Emirates to finish fifth. Scotland won the tournament, beating Ireland by 47 runs in the final.

Dutch batsman Bas Zuiderent was named as Player of the Tournament.

It was the final edition of this competition under the name 'ICC Trophy' before it was renamed to the 'Cricket World Cup Qualifier' for 2009.

Firsts
 The 2005 ICC Trophy featured coloured player clothing, white cricket balls and black sight screens instead of the traditional white clothing, red ball and white sight screens which had been used in the previous editions. 
 All matches were accorded List A status unlike the previous editions which were classified as minor matches.

Competition format
The 12 teams were divided into two groups of six teams. Each team played with each other in its group once. Five matches per team were played between 1 July and 7 July. The resulting group tables were then each divided into three bands of two teams each.

Combining the two groups, the four teams in each band then played a mini knock-out tournament consisting of two semi-finals, a championship, and a consolation match, so that the first- and second-ranked teams from each of the original groups were playing for first through fourth place in the tournament overall; the third- and fourth-ranked teams for fifth through eighth; and the fifth- and sixth-ranked teams for ninth through twelfth. Thus at the end of the tournament all teams are given a definitive rank between 1 and 12. The final play-offs were played on 11 July with the final on 13 July.

Apart from the academic interest in this final classification, one match in particular had great significance: the winner of the second band's mini tournament would, by taking fifth place overall, become the fifth and final team to win temporary ODI status and an invitation to the 2007 Cricket World Cup.

Teams
There were 12 teams that played in the tournament.

The following countries were guaranteed a place in this competition:

The following countries gained a place in this competition through the pre-qualifying competition:

Squads

Group matches

Group A

Ireland (315 for 8) beat Bermuda (218 for 6) easily as Ed Joyce made 103 for the hosts in Stormont.

Denmark beat Uganda by 28 runs as Thomas Munkholt Hansen took 6 for 30 to carry Denmark to a 28-run win over Uganda in Muckamore. Denmark made 196 with Johan Malcolm making 71. Despite 59 from Kenneth Kamyuka, the Africans could only manage 168 in reply.

The United Arab Emirates (200) beat the United States (145), who remain in disarray after their recent political troubles.

The upset of the day was a 30 run win by Bermuda (217) over the United Arab Emirates (187).

The United States went down to a heavy 96 run defeat by Denmark, for whom wicket-keeper Frederik Klokker starred with 138 not out and a smart stumping.

An all-round performance by the Irish batsmen saw them through to 231 for 8 against Uganda. In reply, however, only Frank Nsubuga, with 59, put up any resistance as the hosts ended up winners by 127 runs.

Bermuda (249) steered towards the second spot in the group and the World Cup with a thumping 93-run win over Denmark, who lacked application in their batting as they were all out for 156.

Ireland were troubled by the United Arab Emirates in a match that could decide Ireland's qualification for the Cricket World Cup. The UAE batted first, making 230 in 48.3 overs before being bowled out, and a fiery opening spell from Ali Asad then reduced the Irish to 23 for 4. Ed Joyce and Trent Johnston rebuilt with a partnership of 122, and Joyce batted well with the tail to make 115 not out in Ireland's 231 for 8.

Uganda (237 for 4) recorded their first win, beating the USA by six wickets (236), Joel Olwenyi top-scoring with 76 after all-rounder Frank Nsubuga had taken 3 for 33

All of the Group A games were washed out or abandoned because of weather conditions. Under the playing conditions, the rest day was only to be used as a reserve day if all matches in both groups were washed out. Therefore, the games between Ireland and the United States, Denmark and the United Arab Emirates (after the UAE had reached 57 for 3 after 15 overs), and Uganda and Bermuda were all "no results". The wash-out eliminates the United States from World Cup and ODI status contention.

Bermuda, who were ranked as the third-best team from the Americas coming into the tournament easily overcame the United States. 132 from only 88 balls from JJ Tucker and 52 extras saw the Bermudians through to 311 for 8. The Americans started by keeping up with the run rate, but wickets fell and they finished all out for 198.

Ireland (222 all out) beat Denmark (149 all out) to take the remaining automatic qualifying spot for the World Cup and ODI status.

The UAE (201 all out) secured a 63 run victory over Uganda (138 all out) to make sure they would be in the 5th place semi-final along with the Danes.

Group B

The closest game of the first round was between Canada and Namibia. John Davison, who at the time held the record for the fastest century in the Cricket World Cup made 125, supported by Ian Billcliff's 90 as the North Americans put on 284. In reply, Namibia came close, making 282 to lose by 2 runs in Group B's first heavyweight clash, thanks to Canada's captain, Kevin Sandher's five wickets. Namibia put in a protest, however, claiming that the scoring in the 45th over was wrong. The technical committee turned down Namibia's protest, which prompted Namibia to put in an appeal. Namibia's appeal against the technical committee's ruling was turned down, meaning that Canada retain the 2 points they won on 1 July.

The Netherlands (71 for 1) were easy winners over Papua New Guinea (69 all out) by 9 wickets.

Oman (83) were easily beaten by Scotland (84 for 4) by 6 wickets with 31 overs to spare.

The biggest game of the round saw Scotland (190 for 3), courtesy of Fraser Watts (81*) and Gavin Hamilton (86*) end up winners by 7 wickets over Canada (189).

Namibia (252) got off the board with a comfortable victory over Papua New Guinea (156).

Bas Zuiderent made 119 and Daan van Bunge 92 as Netherlands piled on the runs, whereas only one Omani scored in doubled figures as Oman (67) were completely thrashed by Netherlands (325 for 5) by 258 runs.

Canada got into trouble against Oman – after having bowled them out for 184, wickets fell around John Davison – who made 74 – and Ian Billcliff, but eventually the Canadians snared a two-wicket win.

The Netherlands secured a win over Namibia, but the match was eventually much closer than it could have been. After Edgar Schiferli took four wickets for 50, helping with bowling Namibia out for 188, Bas Zuiderent and Tom de Grooth opened up a partnership of 135. Four quick wickets sent the Dutch struggling to 155 for 4, but Zuiderent and Ryan ten Doeschate saw them home.

Meanwhile, Papua New Guinea were bowled out for 90 by Scotland, John Blain and Dougie Brown taking four wickets each, but Toka Gaudi gave the Scots a scare with his three wickets. However, the Scots managed a five-wicket win.

Scotland (236 for 7) maintained their 100% record with a 27 run win against Namibia (209 all out) in a game reduced to 33 overs in which Ryan Watson starred with 87.

The Netherlands (187 for 9) batted first against Canada in a game reduced to 35 overs a side. A further 19 minute break for bad light meant the Canadians target was reduced to 160 in 30 overs. Despite 5 for 30 from Billy Stelling, Canada reached their target with one ball and 2 wickets to spare in an innings anchored by Desmond Chumney with 64.

Rain reduced Papua New Guinea's match against Oman to a 24 over-a-side affair. The Papuans reached 134 for 7 in their overs, before skittling the Omanis for 41 all out.

With Canada (319 for 4) winning heavily against Papua New Guinea (159 all out), thanks to Billcliff's 102* and Davison's 62, the Canadians made sure they qualified for the World Cup and ODI status on run-rate.

Namibia (173/4) easily overhauled Oman's score of 170 with almost nine overs to spare.

Scotland (221 all out) maintained their 100% record against the Netherlands (123 all out), which saw Scotland through to the semi-finals. The Netherlands, along with Namibia (173 for 4), who beat Oman (170 for 9) by 6 wickets, qualify for the 5th place semi-finals.

Final group tables
The final group tables are as follows:

Semi-finals – 9 July

For 1st–4th places

Ireland defeated Canada in the first semi-final. Winning the toss and bowling, the Irish – weakened by Ed Joyce's return to Middlesex – struggled initially, John Davison hitting eight fours and a run single in his 15-ball 33. However, five Canadian batsmen were out with scores in the thirties, as Canada eventually crept to 238 for 9 – Andre Botha taking four for 47. Ireland's reply started cautiously, yet Sanjayan Thuraisingam and Kevin Sandher shared wickets, and after fifteen overs Ireland were only 60 for 3. With ten overs to go, and Trent Johnston having been caught by Sunil Dhaniram, Ireland needed 68 runs to win. However, Peter Gillespie and Northamptonshire player Andrew White hit out well, Gillespie scoring a career-best score in the ICC Trophy with 64 – and Ireland squeezed home with four balls and four wickets to spare.

Scotland didn't have as tough a time of it against Bermuda, but still had to ponder innumerable wides. In all, Scotland conceded 49 extras in 50 overs, of which 30 were wides – only Bermudian wicket-keeper Dean Minors out-scoring the extras. Bermuda reached a total of 219 for 9, having been 88 for 7, and a fiery opening burst from 42-year-old Dennis Archer had the Scots worried. However, Cedric English and Gavin Hamilton steadied the ship, and the Scots eventually won by six wickets, making 222 for 4 in 46.5 overs.

For 5th–8th places

Denmark were batted out of the game by Bas Zuiderent and Daan van Bunge who both made centuries as the Danish spin bowling was taken to all corners. Van Bunge made 137 and Zuiderent 107 as the Dutch amassed 314 for 6, also helped by Ryan ten Doeschate who made 32. Despite Thomas Hansen bowling a maiden and taking three for 41, it was not enough. In reply, the Danes were in with a shout as long as Frederik Klokker was at the crease, but when he was gone for 52, it was quickly over. The Danes crawled to 225 all out, not a bad score by their standards, but still defeated by 89 runs.

The United Arab Emirates, meanwhile, pulled off a somewhat surprising victory over Namibia, who had qualified for the 2003 Cricket World Cup. Despite all-rounder Gerrie Snyman scoring 83 not out in Namibia's total of 240 for 7, and his early efforts to have UAE on 18 for 2, UAE responded with an experienced all-rounder of their own, Khurram Khan. The captain made 92 as UAE won by six wickets with three overs to spare.

For 9th–12th places

Oman reached the ninth place play-off with a surprise win over Uganda. Oman were initially reduced to 97 for 7, but recovered, Mohammad Aslam scoring 39 as they finished all out for 181. In reply, Kenneth Kamyuka and Lawrence Sematimba paired up for 106 after a shaky start to 37 for 5, but when Sematimba departed for 48 the wheels fell off the Ugandan chase, and they ended all out on 175, losing by six runs.

The United States had relatively few problems in beating Papua New Guinea. First, Imran Awan took four for 46 (including six wides and four no-balls) to help bowl out the Papuans for 171. Then, Steve Massiah and Gowkaran Roopnarine helped themselves to unbeaten fifties, as USA won by eight wickets with 18 overs remaining in the game.

3rd to 12th place placement matches – 11 July

Third place play-off 

Canada disposed of Bermuda relatively easily,  Sanjayan Thuraisingam taking three for 16 in nearly ten overs as Bermuda rolled over for 195, and despite John Davison being out for 5, Canada controlled their way to the target, Zubin Surkari top-scoring with 47 as Canada won by five wickets.

Fifth place play-off 

The Dutch cricket team won this most important of the placement matches on 11 July, as the winner would qualify for the 2007 Cricket World Cup and also for ODI status and several grants from the ICC. Batting first, the Dutch were led to another big score after Bas Zuiderent made another century – this time unbeaten, for 116. Ryan ten Doeschate added 65 not out, while Tim de Leede also made 65, and the Dutch scored 287 for 4. In reply, the UAE always knew they were up against a massive total, and lost wickets exceedingly quickly – their highest partnership was 41, as they made 142 all out, losing by 143 runs.

Seventh place play-off 

The air had gone out of the Danish balloon, as they rolled over to Sarel Burger – one of Namibia's four players named Burger. Having elected to bat, Namibia made 230 for 9, while Danish spinner Bobby Chawla took three for 42. After an opening partnership of 49 between Baljit Singh and Frederik Klokker, Sarel Burger took five wickets for 23 runs, as the Danes crumbled to 127 all out.

Ninth place play-off 

In an unusually high-scoring match, the United States lost despite scoring 345 for 6 in their innings. Roopnarine continued on his semi-final form, making 98, while six sixes from Tony Reid sent his score to 61 not out off 29 balls. The USA looked on course to winning when Oman had been reduced to 211 for 7 – however, Farhan Khan wanted otherwise, smashing nine sixes on his way to 94 not out, and Oman took a three-wicket win.

Eleventh place play-off 

Papua New Guinea, who had qualified for this tournament through the extra chance in the World Cup Qualifying Series, got their first win in an extremely close-run match with Uganda. After young pace bowler Emmanuel Isaneez had taken four for 48 to reduce Papua New Guinea to 203 all out, Papuan Hitolo Areni responded with four quick wickets, as Uganda crumbled to 16 for 4 – and then 153 for 9. Kenneth Kamyuka then showed the Papuans how to stay on strike, as his batting partner Isaneez faced three deliveries in their partnership of 49. However, Kamyuka just could not hit the runs quickly enough, and Uganda ended on 202 for 9 – thus claiming the wooden spoon.

Final – 13 July 
This match was played two days after the other five placement matches. Scotland batted Ireland out of the match, their returning county professionals taking full advantage. Ryan Watson top-scored for the Scots with 94, but Dougie Brown (59 off 44 balls) and Fraser Watts (55) also made big contributions, as the Irish bowling conceded their highest total in this tournament – 324 for 8. Paul Hoffmann ripped out two Irish wickets quickly, but Ed Joyce and wicketkeeper Jeremy Bray rebuilt to 148 for 2. However, a flurry of wickets – Craig Wright taking three for 48 as the most – sent the Irish staring down the barrel, first at 188 for 6, and then at 222 for 9. Not even 34 not out from the number 11, Gordon Cooke could help Ireland, as they lost by 47 runs.

Final standings

1 – On August 9, 2005 the ICC expelled the USA, which saw them not compete in the 2007 Division One.

Leading batsmen 

Source:

Leading bowlers 

Source:

See also

 ICC Trophy
 2005 ICC Intercontinental Cup
 ICC Intercontinental Cup

References

 Official website of the 2005 ICC Trophy
 Cricinfo site on the 2005 ICC Trophy
 ICC site on the 2005 ICC Trophy

ICC World Cup Qualifier
ICC Trophy
2005 in Irish cricket
2005